Elymandra is a genus of African and South American plants in the grass family. Most known species are native to Africa; one is found in Brazil.

 Species
 Elymandra androphila (Stapf) Stapf  - from Senegal to Angola
 Elymandra archaelymandra (Jacq.-Fél.) Clayton  - Guinea, Senegal, Benin, Sierra Leone
 Elymandra gossweileri (Stapf) Clayton - from Senegal to Angola
 Elymandra grallata (Stapf) Clayton from Gambia to KwaZulu-Natal
 Elymandra lithophila (Trin.) Clayton  - Brazil	(State of Minas Gerais), Zaïre to Zimbabwe
 Elymandra subulata Jacq.-Fél. - Guinea, Ivory Coast, Sierra Leone

References

Andropogoneae
Poaceae genera